Vibration white finger (VWF), also known as hand-arm vibration syndrome (HAVS) or dead finger, is a secondary form of Raynaud's syndrome, an industrial injury triggered by continuous use of vibrating hand-held machinery. Use of the term vibration white finger has generally been superseded in professional usage by broader concept of HAVS, although it is still used by the general public. The symptoms of vibration white finger are the vascular component of HAVS.

HAVS is a widespread recognized industrial disease affecting tens of thousands of workers. It is a disorder that affects the blood vessels, nerves, muscles, and joints of the hand, wrist, and arm. Its best known effect is vibration-induced white finger (VWF), a term introduced by the Industrial Injury Advisory Council in 1970. Injury can occur at frequencies between 5 and 2000 Hz but the greatest risk for fingers is between 50 and 300 Hz. The total risk exposure for hand and arm is calculated by the use of ISO 5349-1, which stipulates maximum damage between 8 and 16 Hz and a rapidly declining risk at higher frequencies. The ISO 5349-1 frequency risk assessment has been criticized as corresponding poorly to observational data; more recent research suggests that medium and high frequency vibrations also increase HAVS risk.

Effects
Excessive exposure to hand arm vibrations can result in various patterns of diseases casually known as HAVS or VWF. This can affect nerves, joints, muscles, blood vessels or connective tissues of the hand and forearm:
 Tingling 'whiteness' or numbness in the fingers (blood vessels and nerves affected): This may not be noticeable at the end of a working day, and in mild cases may affect only the tips of the fingers. As the condition becomes more severe, the whole finger down to the knuckles may become white. Feeling may also be lost.
 Fingers change colour (blood vessels affected): With continued exposure the person may experience periodic attacks in which the fingers change colour when exposed to the cold. Initially the fingers rapidly become pale and feeling is lost. This phase is followed by an intense red flush (sometimes preceded by a dusky bluish phase) signalling the return of blood circulation to the fingers and is usually accompanied by uncomfortable throbbing.
 Loss of manual dexterity (nerves and muscles affected): In more severe forms, attacks may occur frequently in cold weather, not only at work, but during leisure activities, such as gardening, car washing or even watching outdoor sports and may last up to an hour causing considerable pain and loss of manual dexterity and reduced grip strength.

In extreme cases, the affected person may lose fingers. The effects are cumulative. When symptoms first appear, they may disappear after a short time. If exposure to vibration continues over months or years, the symptoms can worsen and become permanent.

Prevention
The Control of Vibration at Work Regulations 2005, created under the Health and Safety at Work etc. Act 1974,  is the legislation in the UK that governs exposure to vibration and assists with preventing HAVS occurring.

Good practice in industrial health and safety management requires that worker vibration exposure is assessed in terms of acceleration, amplitude, and duration. Using a tool that vibrates slightly for a long time can be as damaging as using a heavily vibrating tool for a short time. The duration of use of the tool is measured as trigger time, the period when the worker actually has their finger on the trigger to make the tool run, and is typically quoted in hours per day. Vibration amplitude is quoted in metres per second squared, and is measured by an accelerometer on the tool or given by the manufacturer. Amplitudes can vary significantly with tool design, condition and style of use, even for the same type of tool.

In the UK, Health and Safety Executive gives the example of a hammer drill which can vary from 6 m/s² to 25 m/s². HSE publishes a list of typically observed vibration levels for various tools, and graphs of how long each day a worker can be exposed to particular vibration levels. This makes managing the risk relatively straightforward. Tools are given an Exposure Action Value (EAV, the time which a tool can be used before action needs to be taken to reduce vibration exposure) and an Exposure Limit Value (ELV, the time after which a tool may not be used).

In the United States, the National Institute for Occupational Safety and Health published a similar database where values for sound power and vibrations for commonly found tools from large commercial vendors in the United States were surveyed. Further testing is underway for more and newer tools.

The effect of legislation in various countries on worker vibration limits has been to oblige equipment providers to develop better-designed, better-maintained tools, and for employers to train workers appropriately. It also drives tool designers to innovate to reduce vibration. Some examples are the  easily manipulated mechanical arm (EMMA) and the suspension mechanism designed into chainsaws.

Anti-vibration gloves
Anti vibration gloves are traditionally made with a thick and soft palm material to insulate from the vibrations. The protection is highly dependent on frequency range; most gloves provide no protection in palm and wrist below ~50 Hz and in fingers below ~400 Hz. Factors such as high grip force, cold hands or vibration forces in shear direction can have a reducing effect and or increase damage to the hands and arms.  Gloves do help to keep hands warm but to get the desired effect, the frequency output from the tool must match the properties of the vibration glove that is selected. Anti-vibration gloves in many cases amplify the vibrations at frequencies lower than those mentioned in the text above.

Reactive monitoring
A simpler system, known as re-active monitoring, may be used by, for example, monitoring rates of usage of consumable items. Such a system was introduced by Carl West at a fabrication workshop in Rotherham, England. In this system, the vibration levels of the angle grinding tools in use was measured, as was the average life of a grinding disk. Thus by recording numbers of grinding disks used, vibration exposure may be calculated.

History
The symptoms were first described by Professor Giovanni Loriga in Italy in 1911, although the link was not made between the symptoms and vibrating hand tools until a study undertaken by Alice Hamilton MD in 1918. She formed her theory through following the symptoms reported by quarry cutters and carvers in Bedford, Indiana. She also discovered the link between an increase in HAV symptoms and cold weather as 1918 was a particularly harsh winter.

The first scale for assessing the condition, the Taylor-Pelmear scale, was published in 1975, but it was not listed as a prescribed disease in the United Kingdom until 1985, and the Stockholm scale was introduced in 1987. In 1997, the UK High Court awarded £127,000 in compensation to seven coal miners for vibration white finger. A UK government fund set up to cover subsequent claims by ex-coalminers had exceeded £100 million in payments by 2004.

See also
 List of cutaneous conditions
 Hypothenar hammer syndrome

References

External links
 BBC News article on coal miners claims
  basic facts
 UK Health and Safety Executive
 NIOSH Power Tools Sound Power and Vibrations Database 
 HSE webpage HAV case studies

Overuse injuries
Tort law
Lawsuits
Mechanical vibrations
Skin conditions resulting from physical factors